Lajos Balázsovits (born 4 December 1946) is a Hungarian film actor. He appeared in 60 films from 1968 to 2006.

Selected filmography
 The Upthrown Stone (1969)
 The Confrontation (1969)
 Milarepa (1974)
 Electra, My Love (1974)
 Private Vices, Public Pleasures (1976)
 A Very Moral Night (1977)
 Hungarian Rhapsody (1979)
 Bizalom (1980)
 Requiem (1982)
 Season of Monsters (1987)
 Mary, Mother of Jesus (1999)
  The Prince and the Pauper (2000)

External links
 

1946 births
Living people
Hungarian male film actors
People from Nagykanizsa
20th-century Hungarian male actors